Sabu called Kem was High Priest of Ptah, probably during the reign of Pepi I. His precise titles include greatest of the directors of craftsmen belonging to the day of the festival of the Sun (this is the main title of a high priest of Ptah), priest of Sokar in the two houses and priest of Ptah.

Sabu's mastaba (C 23) in Saqqara is described by Mariette. It is built of limestone. The cult chamber consists of only one room, that is decorated with agricultural scenes. Here was also found a statue, showing Sabu totally naked. The statue is now in the Egyptian Museum, Cairo (Catalogue Generale no. 143).

References

Bibliography 

Memphis High Priests of Ptah
Ancient Egyptian priests
People of the Sixth Dynasty of Egypt
Year of death unknown
Year of birth unknown
Pepi I Meryre